The Meghalaya cricket team is a cricket team that represents the state of Meghalaya in Indian domestic competitions. In July 2018, the Board of Control for Cricket in India (BCCI) named the team as one of the nine new sides that would compete in domestic tournaments for the 2018–19 season, including the Ranji Trophy and the Vijay Hazare Trophy. However, prior to the start of the tournament, the team did not have a ground to play first-class cricket on. Ahead of the 2018–19 season, Sanath Kumar was appointed as the team's coach.

In September 2018, they won their opening fixture of the 2018–19 Vijay Hazare Trophy, beating Mizoram by 8 wickets. In their first season in the Vijay Hazare Trophy, they finished in fifth place in the Plate Group, with four wins and four defeats from their eight matches. Puneet Bisht finished as the leading run-scorer, with 502 runs, and Gurinder Singh and Abhay Negi were the joint-leading wicket-takers for the team, with fourteen dismissals each.

In November 2018, in their opening match of the 2018–19 Ranji Trophy, they beat Arunachal Pradesh by seven wickets. They finished the 2018–19 tournament fourth in the table, with four wins from their eight matches.

In March 2019, Meghalaya finished in last place in Group B of the 2018–19 Syed Mushtaq Ali Trophy, with no wins from their six matches. Gurinder Singh was the leading run-scorer for the team in the tournament, with 207 runs, and Abhay Negi was the leading wicket-taker, with eight dismissals.

Squad

Updated as on 17 January 2023

References

Indian first-class cricket teams
Cricket in Meghalaya
Cricket clubs established in 2018
2018 establishments in Meghalaya